Brendan O'Hagan (born 30 October 1998) is a Ireland international rugby league footballer who plays as a  and  for the Wynnum Manly Seagulls in the Queensland Cup.

Background
O'Hagan was born in Gosford, New South Wales, Australia. He is of Irish descent.

Playing career

Club career
O'Hagan played for the Mount Pritchard Mounties in the NSW Cup.

He joined York ahead of the 2021 season.

International career
In 2022 O'Hagan was named in the Ireland squad for the 2021 Rugby League World Cup, making his debut, and scoring a try, against  on 16 October 2022.

References

External links
York Knights profile
Ireland profile

1998 births
Living people
Australian rugby league players
Australian people of Irish descent
Ireland national rugby league team players
Mount Pritchard Mounties players
Rugby league halfbacks
Rugby league players from Gosford, New South Wales
Rugby league hookers
Western Suburbs Magpies NSW Cup players
Wynnum Manly Seagulls players
York City Knights players